The Secret Garden is a musical based on the 1911 novel of the same name by Frances Hodgson Burnett. The musical's script and lyrics are by Marsha Norman, with music by Lucy Simon. It premiered on Broadway in 1991 and ran for 709 performances.

The story is set in the early years of the 20th century. Mary Lennox, an English girl born and raised in the British Raj, is orphaned by a cholera outbreak when she is ten years old. She is sent away from India to the moors of Yorkshire, England, to live in the manor of a brooding uncle she has never met. There, her personality blossoms among the other residents of the manor as they bring new life to a long-neglected garden.

Productions 
The musical debuted as a staged reading at Skidmore College in Saratoga Springs, NY in the summer of 1989, produced by Capital Repertory Theatre. R.J. Cutler directed the summer workshop, and went on to direct the world premiere at the Wells Theatre, Norfolk, Virginia, in a Virginia Stage Company production, running from November 28 to December 17, 1989. The production included scenic design by Heidi Landesman, lighting by Peter Kaczorowski and costumes by Martin Pakledinaz.

The Secret Garden premiered in New York City on Broadway at the St. James Theatre on April 25, 1991, and closed on January 3, 1993, after 709 performances. That production was directed by Susan H. Schulman, with choreography by Michael Lichtefeld. The cast featured Daisy Eagan as Mary Lennox, Mandy Patinkin, Rebecca Luker, Robert Westenberg and John Cameron Mitchell. It won the 1991 Tony Awards for: Best Book of a Musical, Best Featured Actress in a Musical (Daisy Eagan), and Best Scenic Design (Heidi Landesman). At age 11, Eagan was the youngest female recipient of a Tony Award to date. The set resembled an enormous Victorian toy theatre, with pop-out figures, large paper dolls, and elements resembling the collages of Joseph Cornell. Costume designer Theoni V. Aldredge was nominated for the Tony Award, Best Costume Design.

The wardrobe is on display at the Costume World Broadway Collection in Pompano Beach, Florida.

The musical was produced in Australia in 1995 in Brisbane (opened on 27 July), Sydney (opened on 7 September), and Melbourne (opened on 20 December). Directed by Schulman and with sets by Landesman, the production included Philip Quast as Neville Craven and Anthony Warlow as Archibald Craven.
A heavily revised Royal Shakespeare Company version ran at Stratford-upon-Avon in England from 13 November 2000 until 27 January 2001, at the time breaking box office records. Philip Quast, Meredith Braun and Craig Purnell (Best Supporting Performance in a Musical, WhatsOnStage Awards 2002) starred, Adrian Noble directed, and Gillian Lynne staged and choreographed the production. The RSC production transferred to London's West End Aldwych Theatre, where it ran from February to June 2001.

Over the years, The Secret Garden found favor with local and regional theaters. The production mounted by Lamplighters Music Theatre in San Francisco, California, from January 18 to February 3, 2008, is unusual because it used notes from Lucy Simon's personal libretto from the original Broadway show, making it the first reconstruction of the original score since the piece opened on Broadway in 1991.

Mirvish Productions staged the play at the Royal Alexandra Theatre in Toronto, Canada, from February 13 to March 19, 2011, as part of a tour that began at the Edinburgh Festival Theatre in Edinburgh, Scotland.

The Secret Garden returned to the West End for 6 weeks in July and August 2016 at the Ambassadors Theatre with a company of child actors, directed by Rupert Hands.

Washington, D.C.'s Shakespeare Theatre Company, in collaboration with Seattle, Washington's 5th Avenue Theatre, presented the musical from November 15, 2016, to January 8, 2017, directed by David Armstrong. Michael Kahn (Artistic Director at the time) noted that this production is "an active reworking" of the musical. Daisy Eagan returned to the show as the chambermaid Martha, with Anya Rothman as Mary, Michael Xavier as Archibald Craven, and Josh Young as Dr. Neville Craven. The production has revisions that include new songs, deletions (including the songs "Round-Shouldered Man", "Quartet", "Race You to the Top of the Morning") and re-arranging. Overall, it condenses and streamlines the story to a shorter running time, with Norman and Simon's involvement. The production was performed at the 5th Avenue Theatre in Seattle from April 14 to May 6, 2017, and at the Theatre Under the Stars in Houston, Texas, October 10–22. That January, Playbill wrote about plans for this production to go to Broadway, but the production's timeline was canceled.

In February 2018, Playbill wrote about plans for the first Broadway revival, with Warren Carlyle as director/choreographer and with a cast, theatre, and other details to come. A lab production prior to the Broadway revival, also directed by Carlyle, was planned to run from May 19 to June 8. Participants in the lab production included Sierra Boggess as Lily, Matt Doyle as Albert, Drew Gehling as Neville, Clifton Duncan as Archibald and Brooklyn Shuck as Mary. The revival did not come to pass in the 2018–19 season and there has been no further word on the project. When Warren Carlyle was interviewed by Ken Davenport for The Producer's Perspective Podcast in May 2019, he said that the revival was still on the table. They had a cast lined up, they were just waiting for the right theatre to be available. The revival's workshop streamed from May 6-9, 2021. The production premiered at the Ahmanson Theatre in Los Angeles and will run from February 19 through March 26, 2023. Sierra Boggess has been announced to star as Lily. Other cast members include Sadie Brickman Reynolds as Mary Lennox, Derrick Davis as Archibald Craven, Emily Jewel Hoder as Mary Lennox, Aaron Lazar as Dr. Neville Craven, Julia Lester as Martha, John-Michael Lyles as Dickon, Terron Brooks as Major Shelley, Mark Capri as Ben Weatherstaff, Peyton Crim as Major Holmes, Susan Denaker as Mrs. Medlock, Kelley Dorney as Mrs. Winthrop/Cholera, Ali Ewoldt as Rose Lennox, William Foon as Colin Craven alternate, Ava Madison Gray as Mary Lennox alternate, John Krause as Captain Albert Lennox, Reese Levine as Colin Craven, Yamuna Meleth as Ayah, Cassandra Marie Murphy as Mrs. Shelley, James Olivas as Lieutenant Wright, Kyla Jordan Stone as Alice, Vishal Vaidya as Fakir, and Ariel Neydavoud, with Randi De Marco and Sam Linkowski serving as swings.

Opera Australia and the Gordon Frost Organisation intended to stage the 25th-anniversary production, again directed by Susan H. Schulman, opening in Sydney in August 2020, with a Melbourne season to follow. Anthony Warlow was expected to reprise the role of Archibald Craven. Opera Australia canceled the 25th-anniversary production in April 2020 because of the COVID-19 pandemic.

Concerts
The Secret Garden was The Third Annual World AIDS Day Benefit Concert, held on December 5, 2005, at the Manhattan Center Studios Grand Ballroom, New York City. This was the first NY revisitation of the show since its original Broadway run. The concert was directed by Stafford Arima and produced by Jamie McGonnigal. The cast featured Laura Benanti as Lily, Steven Pasquale as Archie, Will Chase as Neville, Celia Keenan-Bolger as Martha, David Canary as Ben, Jaclyn Neidenthal as Mary, Struan Erlenborn as Colin, Max von Essen as Albert, Sara Gettelfinger as Rose, and Michael Arden as Dickon. The cast also included Matt Cavenaugh, Jenny Powers, Ben Magnuson, Shonn Wiley, Reshma Shetty, Deborah S. Craig, Nehal Joshi, and Kate Shindle, with Barbara Rosenblat returning to the role she created, Mrs. Medlock. 

Manhattan Concert Productions presented a concert production of The Secret Garden at Lincoln Center for two nights on February 21 and 22, 2016, with Sydney Lucas starring as Mary Lennox. She was joined by the original "Mary Lennox", Daisy Eagan, who now plays the role of Martha, and Barbara Rosenblat, returning to her original role of Mrs. Medlock. Also in the cast were Ramin Karimloo as Archibald Craven, Sierra Boggess as Lily, Cheyenne Jackson as Neville Craven, Ben Platt as Dickon, Jere Shea as Ben, Oscar Williams as Colin Craven, Nikki Renée Daniels as Rose, Josh Young as Captain Albert Lennox and Telly Leung as Fakir.

Rebecca Luker (the original Lily) appeared in a benefit concert for the Make-A-Wish Foundation of Metro New York and Western New York at the Lucille Lortel Theatre on January 11, 2016. The concert was originally scheduled to be one night only, but a second performance was added for January 17. Daisy Eagan, the original "Mary Lennox" was the host for the concerts.

The Secret Garden (in concert) was presented in Toronto, Canada, in January 2017 as the inaugural show of a newly formed theatre company Podium Concert Productions, headed by Producer Peter da Costa and Conductor Mark Camilleri.

In February 2019, The Secret Garden was presented by the Virginia Stage Company in the Norfolk Botanical Gardens in a concert to celebrate the company's 40th anniversary. This is the first time that The Secret Garden has been staged there since the World Premiere in 1989.

A one night concert version of the musical played at the London Palladium on August 28, 2022. This has been postponed twice due to COVID-19. The cast has Westlife's Mark Feehily and acclaimed West End actor Hadley Fraser as the two brothers, joined by rising star Darcy Jacobs as Mary. The concert follows the original Broadway version, which has never been performed in the U.K until now.

Synopsis 
This synopsis describes the original Broadway production; the reworked London production altered this sequence by moving or omitting several scenes and songs.

Act I
Mary Lennox, a sickly 10-year-old English girl who has lived mostly in isolation in India since birth, dreams of English nursery rhymes and Hindi chants ("Opening"). Survivors of a cholera outbreak discover Mary and inform her that her parents and nearly everyone she knew, including her Ayah, have died during the epidemic ("There's a Girl").

Mary is sent to live in England with her mysterious uncle Archibald Craven, a reclusive hunchback who has spent years grieving the death of his wife, Lily. Due to Archibald's introversion, the management of his manor house, Misselthwaite, is largely left to his manipulative brother, Dr. Neville Craven. The housekeeper, Mrs. Medlock, coldly welcomes Mary to Yorkshire ("The House Upon the Hill"). Due to Archibald and Mary's lingering grief, the house is haunted by ghosts from their pasts (identified in the libretto as "dreamers" who sometimes act as a Greek chorus of narrators, including the ghosts of Mary's parents, Rose and Albert). Lonely and misbehaving, Mary despises her new surroundings and her first night there hears echoes of crying voices ("I Heard Someone Crying"). The next morning, Mary meets Martha, a young chambermaid who encourages Mary to go play outside by telling her about the surrounding moorland and, in particular, a hidden garden ("If I Had a Fine White Horse"). Archibald remains submerged in his ghostly memories of Lily ("A Girl In the Valley").

Mary explores the grounds' Victorian-style topiary maze, discovering the walled garden overgrown with ivy. She encounters the old gardener Ben Weatherstaff ("It's a Maze"), who says the garden has been locked since Lily's death, as it reminds Archibald of her, and its door has been lost somewhere behind the weeds. Martha's mystical brother, Dickon, invokes the spring ("Winter's On the Wing") in a rustic druid-like fashion. When he comes upon Mary, he gives her some seeds, claims that he can converse with animals, and teaches her to speak the Yorkshire dialect to a robin, which guides Mary to the garden's secret key ("Show Me the Key").

Inside the manor, Neville and Archibald are discussing how Neville abandoned his medical practice to take care of a bedridden boy when Mary suddenly enters. She asks Archibald for a bit of earth to plant a garden of her own. He allows it and, after she leaves, confides to Neville that his dreams of Lily have been worsening, which Neville blames on the arrival of Mary, who bears a strong physical resemblance to her aunt Lily. Curious at the simple modesty of Mary's request for some earth, Archibald muses on Lily and Mary's shared interest in gardening ("A Bit of Earth"). As the Yorkshire gloom turns to a fearsome storm ("Storm I"), Archibald and Neville grieve separately over Lily; thus, it is revealed that both men were in love with her ("Lily's Eyes"). Mary again hears crying ("Storm II"), but this time she uncovers its source: Colin, a secret cousin of hers who has been confined to bed since his birth, when his mother Lily died. Colin has been in bed his entire life because his father Archibald, probably following Neville's misleading medical advice, feared that Colin would also become a hunchback. Colin confides in Mary that he nightly dreams of a man who comes to him and reads from a magical book ("A Round-Shouldered Man"). However, just as Mary and Colin embrace each other's long-desired company, Neville and Mrs. Medlock burst in and angrily tell her she is never to see Colin again because of his fragile medical condition. As the storm reaches its peak, a distraught Mary runs outside, where the ghost of Lily reveals the location of the hidden door to the garden, and Mary inserts the key ("Final Storm").

Act II
Mary has a reverie about her loved ones and her desire for the garden to offer her privacy and the chance to discover herself ("The Girl I Mean to Be"). Neville's musings are darker; enviously recalling his unrequited love for Lily, Neville wants Archibald to leave Misselthwaite entirely to him. The two brothers' thoughts are interwoven with ghostly echoes of old arguments between Lily and her sister Rose (Mary's mother) about Archibald's suitability as a prospective husband and father ("Quartet"). The melancholy Archibald has decided to slip away to Paris for a while, pausing only to read a fairy tale to Colin while the boy sleeps ("Race You To the Top of the Morning"). Thus, the "round-shouldered man" is not a dream at all but merely Colin's own father, who, despite his emotional devastation, still deeply loves his son.

Mary tells Dickon that she has now been inside the garden but the plants are all dead. Dickon explains that it is probably just dormant and that, with some assistance, it will grow back ("Wick"). Mary tells Colin about the garden, but he is reluctant to go outside until he is encouraged by an inviting vision of his mother Lily ("Come to My Garden/Lift Me Up"). Mary, Dickon, and Martha clandestinely bring Colin to the garden in a wheelchair. In the garden, the exercise, fresh air, and magical incantations in both Hindi and English led by Mary, the ghosts, and the manor staff strengthen Colin, allowing him to rise from his wheelchair for the first time ("Come Spirit, Come Charm"). Ben reveals that Lily died giving birth to Colin from injuries sustained during an accident in the garden. Colin makes Mary and the staff promise not to tell Archibald about Colin's recovery until he is able to fully walk. The onlooking ghosts sing the praises of the renewed garden ("A Bit of Earth (Reprise)").

Back in the house, Neville faces down Mary as he threatens to send her away to boarding school, culminating in a violent confrontation between the doctor and the girl. Immediately after, Martha soothes Mary, telling her to stay strong ("Hold On"). With Martha's help, Mary writes to Archibald in Paris ("Letter Song"), urging him to come home. Archibald's emotional turmoil continues to dominate him ("Where In the World"); however, Lily's ghost reappears, Archibald is able to see her, and she tells him that she always loved him. They come to the conclusion that her death was no one's fault, and Archibald can finally let her go as she tells him to care for their child and go home ("How Could I Ever Know"). Returning, he enters the garden to find Colin completely healthy; in fact, he is beating Mary in a footrace when Archibald walks through the door. Archibald, a changed man, sends Neville away to his Paris flat and triumphantly embraces Mary and Colin back into his life. The spirits of Mary's parents join Lily, promising to keep the living safe for the rest of their days ("Finale").

Changes from the original novel 
Burnett's novel primarily focused on Mary and her interactions with Colin, Martha, and Dickon. The musical adds more emphasis on the adult characters by presenting (and to some extent, inventing) the shared history entwining the two families. Originally, Burnett stated that the name of Archibald's wife was Lilias, and that she was the sister of Mary Lennox's father; in the musical, Colin's and Mary's mothers are sisters named Lily and Rose respectively.

In the book, Colin's private physician is an otherwise unnamed poor cousin of Archibald Craven; Colin privately remarks to Mary that Dr. Craven is the next heir to Misselthwaite and "always looks cheerful when [Colin's health] is worse", but Burnett also states that Dr. Craven is "not an unscrupulous man, though he was a weak one, and he did not intend to let [Colin] run into actual danger". The musical heightens the doctor's conflict of interest and makes him the primary antagonist as Archibald's brother, Dr. Neville Craven, who once hopelessly loved Lily. Mary expressly accuses of him of wanting Colin to die for the sake of his inheritance.

Songs 

Act I
 "Opening" – Lily, Mary, Company
 "There's a Girl (Part I)" – Company
 "The House Upon the Hill" – Company
 "There's a Girl (Part II)" – Company
 "I Heard Someone Crying" – Lily, Mary, Archibald, Company
 "If I Had A Fine White Horse" – Martha
 "A Girl in the Valley" – Lily, Archibald
 "It's a Maze" – Mary, Ben, Dickon
 "Winter's on the Wing" – Dickon
 "Show Me the Key" – Mary, Dickon
 "It's a Maze (Reprise I)" - Company
 "A Bit of Earth" – Archibald
 "Storm I" – Company
 "Lily's Eyes" – Archibald, Neville
 "Storm II" – Mary, Company
 "Round-Shouldered Man" – Colin
 "Final Storm" – Company

Act II
 "The Girl I Mean to Be" – Mary
 "The House Upon the Hill (Reprise)" – Company
 "Quartet" – Archibald, Lily, Neville, Rose
 "There's a Man" – Company
 "Race You to the Top of the Morning" – Archibald
 "It's a Maze (Reprise II)" – Albert, Rose
 "Wick" – Dickon, Mary
 "Come to My Garden" – Lily
 "Lift Me Up" – Colin
 "Come Spirit, Come Charm" – Mary, Dickon, Martha, Lily, Company
 "A Bit of Earth (Reprise)" – Lily, Rose, Albert
 "Disappear" – Neville
 "Hold On" – Martha
 "Letter Song" – Mary, Archibald, Martha
 "Where in the World?" – Archibald
 "How Could I Ever Know?" – Lily, Archibald
 "Come Spirit, Come Charm (Reprise)" – Dickon, Mary, Colin
 "Finale: Come to My Garden (Reprise)" – Company

Characters, casts, and recordings

(*On the London cast recording, this role was sung by Christian Patterson)

A full recording was made with the original Broadway cast, including all of the songs listed above as well as some interstitial material, and released on CD by Columbia Records in 1991 (catalog number CK 48817). Colin's part in the second act duet "Come to My Garden / Lift Me Up" was recorded by Joel E. Chaiken because, by the time the album was recorded, Babcock's voice had changed, and he could no longer the boy soprano range required in the song.

An eight-song "highlights" album with Fiddes, Ritchie, and the rest of the Australian cast was released on CD by Polydor Records Australia in 1995 (catalog number 579 997-2).

The original London production was partially reworked for production by the Royal Shakespeare Company, reducing the emphasis on the adult characters to return the plot closer to the original book. A full recording of this version was released on CD by First Night Records in 2001.

Awards and nominations

Original Broadway production

Notes

References 
 Norman, Marsha (book and lyrics) and Lucy Simon (music), based on the novel by Frances Hodgson Burnett. The Secret Garden. Samuel French Inc, 1993.

External links 
 
 Photographs from the April 2007 production of The Secret Garden by The Melodramatics

Broadway musicals
1991 musicals
Musicals based on novels
Musicals by Marsha Norman
Plays set in the 1900s
Plays set in India
Plays set in England
Tony Award-winning musicals